Toasted ravioli, colloquially known as T-Ravs, is breaded deep-fried ravioli, usually served as an appetizer but can also be used to consume dipping sauce. It was created and popularized in St. Louis, Missouri at two restaurants, Mama Campisi's and Charlie Gitto's.  Both are located in an Italian-American neighborhood, "The Hill".

Origin
Most accounts of toasted ravioli trace its origins to a predominantly Italian-American neighborhood of St. Louis, The Hill. Supposedly, in the early 1940s, a ravioli was accidentally dropped into the fryer at Mama Campisi's by a drunk chef. "Mickey Garagiola, older brother of Major League Baseball Hall-of-Famer Joe Garagiola, was actually at the bar during the mishap and was the first to taste the accidental treat."  Shortly thereafter, the item began appearing on menus across The Hill. 

Many other restaurants in The Hill claim its creation, among them, Charlie Gitto's "On The Hill" restaurant (then known as "Angelo's"). That story claims that a German chef at Angelo's, accidentally dropped the pasta into oil after a misunderstanding.  Another claim is from Louis Oldani. Oldani is said to have named the dish 'toasted' ravioli  because he thought 'toasted' was more appealing than 'fried'.

Lombardo's Restaurants, located around the St. Louis area, also claim to have been among the first to bring toasted ravioli to the States from Sicily; their current owner, Tony Lombardo, shows menus from the 1930s that include it. Lombardo's toasted raviolis frequently top lists as the "best t-ravs in St. Louis".

Composition, varieties, and service 
Generally, some type of meat is wrapped in square ravioli, breaded and deep fried until the pasta shell becomes slightly crispy, dry and browned. Toasted ravioli is generally served with marinara sauce for dipping and parmesan cheese may also be sprinkled on top. Toasted ravioli can be stored pre-made and frozen, which allows it to be easily prepared by fry cooks or bar staff without special skill or training.

See also

 St. Louis cuisine
Cuisine of the Midwest
Cuisine of the United States
Fried wonton, a deep fried and crispy Chinese dumpling
Pot sticker, a pan fried Chinese dumpling
 List of deep fried foods
 List of pasta dishes

References

External links
Jerry Forte's Recipe for Toasted Ravioli as collected by FoodNetwork
History of The Hill, famous for Toasted Ravioli
Examining the mysterious past of St. Louis' toasted ravioli

Cuisine of St. Louis
Italian-American cuisine
Italian-American culture in Missouri
Pasta dishes
Cuisine of the Midwestern United States
Food and drink introduced in 1943
Appetizers
Christmas food
Deep fried foods